The 1894–95 season was the tenth since the foundation of Southampton St. Mary's F.C. and their first in league football, being founder members of the Southern League.

They finished the league season in third place behind the champions, Millwall Athletic, and Luton Town. In the FA Cup they reached the first round proper for the first time, where they were defeated by Nottingham Forest, of the Football League.

Summary of the season

In 1894, Southampton St Mary's were one of the nine founder members of the Southern League, which had been created to enable clubs in southern England who were not admitted to the Football League, to play competitive football on a regular basis.  St. Mary's were not originally invited to join the new league and their initial application to join had been rejected, even though seven of the original nine clubs were wholly or mainly amateur, whereas Southampton had employed their first professional footballer in 1892 and by now the team was composed mainly of professionals. Because of the interest in the new league, a Second Division was to be created, which Southampton were considering applying to join when the 2nd Scots Guards withdrew and St. Mary's were invited to take their place.

In his preview of the forthcoming season in the Southampton Times, "Ariel" predicted:It is very wonderful to notice the pertinacity with which the prophets continue to prophecy. Southampton St. Mary's have not yet played in the competition, but their position at the end of the season has already been positively fixed by some people, and I have not heard anybody place them lower than third on the list, Millwall Athletic and Luton only taking precedence.
For the start of their League career, Saints signed several new players on professional contracts, including Charles Baker and Alf Littlehales from Stoke and Fred Hollands from Millwall.

Saints' first league match was played at the Antelope Ground on 6 October 1894 in front of a crowd estimated at between 4,000 and 5,000, who paid 6d each for admittance; Harry Offer, Jack Angus and Fred Hollands scored in a 3–1 victory over Chatham. During the match, Chatham's centre-forward, Gamble, was sent-off for making "uncomplimentary" comments to the referee following Southampton's second goal, for which he claimed the ball had been "carried right into goal on one of the player's arms".

The Saints' first home defeat came against Luton on 22 December (2–1), having previously lost at Luton by a 4–1 scoreline; the worst defeat (4–0) came at Millwall on 23 March with their best result coming a week later, a 7–1 victory over Swindon Town on 30 March, with two goals each from Jack Angus and Herbert Ward. Saints finished their inaugural league season in third place, behind Millwall and Luton Town.

Saints supplemented their fixture list with several friendly matches, including matches in November against Football League clubs, Stoke and Bolton Wanderers, the latter being won 5–2. On 19 January, the Saints entertained a team from the Wiltshire Regiment, winning 13–0 on a "quagmire of a pitch" at the Antelope Ground, with Joe Rogers scoring ten goals. in April, after the league season had ended, the Saints entertained teams from Tottenham Hotspur (drawn 0–0) and the famous Corinthian club, which was won 2–0.

The Saints continued to take part in the local cup tournaments, winning the Hampshire Senior Cup for the third time with a 5–1 victory in the final over the Royal Artillery.

League results

Legend

Top of league table

FA Cup
In the FA Cup, Southampton met Newbury on 13 October 1894 in the first qualifying round at the Antelope Ground. Saints were "in particularly rampant mood" and won 14–0, with hat-tricks from Herbert Ward and Arthur Nineham; this is still Southampton's biggest victory in a competitive match. They had easy victories in the next three rounds, defeating Reading 5–2, Marlow 7–3 and Warmley 5–1, with all four qualifying matches being played at the Antelope Ground. This meant that the Saints went into the draw for the First Round proper for the first time, from which they received yet another home tie, against Nottingham Forest of the First Division.

The match against Nottingham Forest was played at the Antelope Ground on 2 February 1895. On the day of the match, the pitch was covered with three inches (76 mm)  of snow. After a long delay, while the referee assessed whether or not the frozen ground was fit to play on, the crowd (estimated at 7,000) were admitted. Despite scoring 31 goals in the qualifying stages, the Saints were no match for the "skill, subtlety and cohesion" of their opponents who ran out 4–1 victors, with two goals from Thomas Rose The local press blamed the defeat on the failure of the Southampton players to train adequately and also suggested that the "more northerly visitors were more accustomed to the Arctic conditions".

Player statistics
The players who appeared in the Southern League or FA Cup matches were as follows. This list does not include players who only played in friendly or reserve team matches.

Key
 GK — Goalkeeper
 FB — Full back
 HB — Half back
 FW — Forward

Notes
  A. Ward played at Millwall on 23 March 1895, on trial from the Lancaster Regiment, for whom he impressed when he played against St. Mary's in a friendly in February. He was unable to reproduce his form in the league match and played no other senior football for the club.

Transfers

In

Departures

References

Bibliography

External links
 Southampton's kit designs

Southampton F.C. seasons
Southampton